Sykia (Sykia) is a small doline in Athens, Greece.

It takes its name from the fig tree growing in the debris cone on the doline floor. It is next to the asphalt road continuing from the cemetery of Voula.

The doline was first recorded by a British airman immediately following the Second World War and was investigated soon after. It is now frequently used as a good practice area for single rope technique by Athenian caving clubs. It lies very close to the better known Vari Cave.

Caves of Greece
Sinkholes of Europe
Landforms of Attica
Landforms of Central Greece